Świelubie is a village in the administrative district of Gmina Dygowo, within Kołobrzeg County, West Pomeranian Voivodeship, in north-western Poland.

For the Viking Age settlement that has been excavated in the vicinity, see Bardy-Świelubie.

References

Villages in Kołobrzeg County